Rear-Admiral John Pasco (1774–1853) served in the Royal Navy between 1784 and 1853, eventually rising to the rank of rear admiral. He acted as signal officer on board  at the Battle of Trafalgar and notably advised on the wording of Nelson's famous signal "England expects that every man will do his duty".

Early life
He continued serving on various ships as midshipman and master's mate until 1795, mainly in the English Channel and West Indies.

In 1796 he joined  under Lancelot Skynner (who, three years later, captained HMS Lutine on her last voyage). During his service aboard Beaulieu he assisted in the capture of St Lucia and on 27 December 1799 he became first lieutenant aboard . In 1801, while still on Immortalite, he volunteered to command a boat to cut out the French corvette Chevrette from Camaret Bay on the north coast of Brittany; however, bad weather frustrated the plan.

On 7 April 1803 he was assigned to Nelson's flagship . While serving on Victory he assisted in the capture of the French 32-gun frigate , was involved in the blockade of Toulon and pursued the French squadrons in the West Indies.

Trafalgar
On the day of the Battle of Trafalgar Nelson appointed Pasco as signal officer. In this role he was to hoist the famous signal "England expects that every man will do his duty". 
Nelson asked Pasco to send the message "England confides that every man will do his duty". Pasco suggested  "expects" be substituted for "confides", since the former was in the signal book, whereas confides would have to be spelt out letter-by-letter. Nelson quickly agreed to the change, Pasco recorded:

Nelson then ordered "Engage the enemy more closely" to be sent. Pasco ran it up and it remained flying until shot away in the battle. Pasco was severely wounded in the right side and arm with grapeshot early in the engagement and was carried below decks.

It was Nelson's personal practice to assign the officer first on his list for promotion to the role of signal officer, and the second on his list to the position of First Lieutenant. John Quilliam, the Sixth Lieutenant, was appointed to the position of First Lieutenant vacated by Pasco's promotion to signal officer during the battle. It is likely that Pasco would have been advanced, but Nelson's death meant standard Navy traditions were followed rather than his personal preferences - Quilliam was promoted to Captain while Pasco and the other lieutenants were only made up to Commander.

At Nelson's state funeral in January 1806 Pasco was given the honour of accompanying the coffin to St Paul's Cathedral with some of the other officers (and one warrant officer) from the Victory.

Later life and service
With no ship to command and nursing an injury, Pasco returned to land. He had married Rebecca Penfold on 1 September 1805, and would eventually have nine children with her, six sons (two of whom died as children) and three daughters. He remained without a ship on half-pay until 1808. For his injury he received a pension of £250 and a grant from the Lloyd's Patriotic Fund.

In May 1808 he managed to obtain the command of HMS Mediator for three months. During the voyage he showed an eagerness in pursuing and engaging any unknown ships, perhaps in an attempt to provide for his growing family from the spoils.

On his return he was appointed to  where on 3 April 1811 he was appointed captain. Stationed in Halifax, he captured several French and American vessels including in August 1811, an American slave schooner named Severn, which became the highly successful British privateer .

During this last appointment he took several smuggling vessels. He remained captain of Lee until she was paid off in September 1818.

Thereafter, Pasco remained without a ship for almost 30 years. Still, on 19 February 1842 he was selected as a recipient of the Captain's Good Service Pension. In 1843 he was married again, to Eliza, the widow of the Royal Marine, Captain Weaver.

In 1846 he was placed in command of HMS Victory at Portsmouth. He was promoted to Rear-Admiral of the Blue on 22 September 1847, Rear-Admiral of the White on 9 October 1849, and Rear-Admiral of the Red sometime in 1852. He died in East Stonehouse on 16 November 1853.

See also

References

Royal Navy rear admirals
Royal Navy personnel of the French Revolutionary Wars
Royal Navy personnel of the Napoleonic Wars
1774 births
1853 deaths